Ricardo Ahued Bardahuil (born 18 April 1957) is a Mexican politician affiliated with National Regeneration Movement. He currently serves as a senator representing Veracruz in the LXIV Legislature of the Mexican Congress. From 2009 to 2012, he was a deputy in the LXI Legislature as a member of the Institutional Revolutionary Party.
In October 2018, the director of the Morena party in Veracruz, Manuel Huerta Ladrón de Guevara, criticized Ahued for making remarks about the water supply in Xalapa, noting that Ahued was not a member of the party despite being in its Senate caucus.

References

1957 births
Living people
Politicians from Pachuca, Hidalgo
Members of the Chamber of Deputies (Mexico)
Institutional Revolutionary Party politicians
21st-century Mexican politicians
Morena (political party) politicians
Members of the Congress of Veracruz
Municipal presidents in Veracruz